Sari County is in Mazandaran province, Iran. The capital of the county is the city of Sari. At the 2006 census, the county's population was 490,830 in 132,919 households. The following census in 2011 counted 478,370 people in 145,339 households, by which time Miandorud District had been separated from the county to form Miandorud County. At the 2016 census, the county's population was 504,298 in 165,467 households.

Administrative divisions

The population history and structural changes of Sari County's administrative divisions over three consecutive censuses are shown in the following table. The latest census shows six districts, 15 rural districts, and four cities.

References

 

Counties of Mazandaran Province